The 2010–11 Aston Villa F.C. season was Aston Villa's 136th professional season; their 100th season in the top-flight; and their 23rd consecutive season in the top flight of English football, the Premier League. It was also the first (and only) season under French manager Gérard Houllier, who was appointed after previous boss Martin O'Neill resigned on 9 August 2010. Despite a generally disappointing season in both the league and cup competitions, a late surge allowed the club to finish in 9th position in the Premier League (3 places lower than their 6th-place finish the previous season).

Aston Villa once again competed in the UEFA Europa League, marking their 2nd consecutive season in the tournament and 3rd consecutive season in European competition overall. However, after drawing the away fixture, Aston Villa were eliminated for the second consecutive year in the play-off round, and again at the hands of Rapid Vienna.

This season marked the first time that four West Midlands county clubs performed in the Premier League. Aston Villa once again contested the Second City derby with Birmingham City, who remain in the league, alongside Wolverhampton Wanderers, who also avoided relegation. West Bromwich Albion also join them in the league, meaning that Villa will contest a total of six local derbies throughout the duration of the Premier League season. An additional derby game at Birmingham City took place on 1 December 2010 in the Football League Cup.

Notable events include Kyle Walker scoring on his debut only nine minutes into the match against former club Sheffield United in the third round of the FA Cup in January 2011. In February, Walker scored his first ever Premier League goal, a 30-yard strike low into the left corner against Fulham.

Kits 
Supplier: Nike / Sponsor: FxPro

Kit information 
The home kit for 2010–11 season featured claret socks, but the most conspicuous feature was the checkerboard patterns on the side of the shirts. This was repeated on away kit, which was just a plain black shirt with sky blue trimmings. The three goalkeeper kits were yellow, jade and grey and was based on Nike's zigzag template designed exclusively for big club goalkeepers.

Players 
Updated 21 January 2011.

Premier League squad 
Players under 21 do not need to be named and can still be used.

Under-21 Players

UEFA Europa League Players
These players were not part of Aston Villa's Premier League squad, but were given squad numbers and selected to play for the club in the UEFA Europa League.

Squad numbers 
Villa's squad numbers for this season were announced on 12 August 2010. The only major changes from the previous year saw defender Stephen Warnock wearing the number 3 shirt which had last belonged to Wilfred Bouma, and Stephen Ireland take over Marlon Harewood's number 9.

Villa's squad numbers were revised ahead of the Premier League fixture at home to Bolton Wanderers on 19 September 2010. Many of the club's young players had their numbers reduced below 30, with the exception of goalkeeper Elliot Parish, who remained at number 43. Andy Marshall retained the number 33 shirt on his return to the club.

Robert Pires took the number 8 shirt on his arrival at the club, which was previously worn by James Milner. Loan signing Kyle Walker received the number 36 shirt, while incoming striker Darren Bent acquired number 39. Newly signed midfielder Jean Makoun took over the number 17 shirt from teammate Moustapha Salifou, who remained without a replacement squad number. Michael Bradley took over the vacant number 13 shirt upon his arrival to Villa on loan from Borussia Mönchengladbach.

Managerial changes 

Aston Villa completed their pre-season preparations under former boss Martin O'Neill. However, he resigned from his position as manager on 9 August 2010, just five days before Villa's opening Premier League tie at home to West Ham United. Reserve team coach Kevin MacDonald was appointed as caretaker manager with immediate effect.

MacDonald managed Villa until 8 September 2010, when former Liverpool and Olympique Lyonnais manager Gérard Houllier was officially announced as O'Neill's successor. MacDonald had previously announced his intentions to apply for the position on a full-time basis, however the club opted to sign Houllier instead. MacDonald did however take charge of Villa's next two games, before Houllier officially took the reins on 22 September after fulfilling his duties with the France national team.

On 22 April 2011, Gérard Houllier was taken to hospital with chest pains with the doctors fearing another heart attack (he suffered a heart attack in 2001 while manager of Liverpool). It was later ruled out with the Frenchman ordered to bed rest and medicine. Assistant manager Gary McAllister took charge of Houllier's managerial duties on 23 April for the Premier League match with Stoke City at Villa Park, and it was later revealed that Houllier would not be able to return to the touchline until after the end of the season.

Transfers

In 

Summer

Winter

Loans in 
Winter

Trialists

Out 
Summer

Winter

Loans out 
Summer

Winter

Spring

Fixtures and results

Premier League 

Villa again competed in the Premier League, after finishing sixth for the third season in a row during 2009–10.
The fixtures were officially announced on 17 June 2010.

Results by matchday

FA Cup 

Villa entered the FA Cup at the third round, which is traditionally played in early January.

League Cup 

The club enter the League Cup at the third round as runners-up, after losing in the final of the previous year's tournament to Manchester United.

UEFA Europa League 

Villa will again compete in the UEFA Europa League after finishing sixth in the Premier League of 2009–10. They will enter at the play-off round.

Play-off round 

On 6 August 2010, Villa were drawn with Rapid Vienna of Austria in the play-off round, the same team that knocked them out at the same stage the previous season. The first leg of the tie was played away at the Gerhard Hanappi Stadium on 19 August, resulting in a 1–1 draw. The teams met again at Villa Park for the return fixture a week later on 26 August, with the Austrian side progressing once again thanks to a 3–2 win.

Friendly matches

Guadiana Trophy 

Villa played in the Guadiana Trophy in the summer as part of their pre-season preparations. The fixtures of this tournament were announced on 20 May 2010. All games were played at the Complexo Desportivo de Vila Real de Santo António in Vila Real de Santo António, Portugal.

As there were only three teams in this year's edition of the Guadiana Trophy, a penalty shootout was carried out at the end of each fixture to make sure that a clear winner could be selected. A penalty shootout was not played in the fixture against Benfica as their win marked them outright tournament winners.

Villa finished second out of third in the tournament.

Goalscorers 
Players with the same number of goals are listed alphabetically
 Players highlighted in light grey denote the player had scored for the club before leaving for another club
 Players highlighted in light cyan denote the player has scored for the club after arriving at Aston Villa during the season
 Players highlighted in Blonde denote the player has scored for the club before leaving the club on loan for part/the rest of the season

End of Season Awards

Sponsorship 

In June 2010, it was revealed on Aston Villa's official website that a new sponsorship deal with Cyprus-based company FxPro Financial Services Limited that will run from 2010 until 2013. The deal, described as "the biggest in the club's history", will replace the charity sponsorship that Aston Villa had with Acorns Children's Hospice for the previous two seasons. However, this partnership will still continue as Acorns have been named as the official charity partner of the club. However, in February 2011 it was announced that Aston Villa and FxPro had agreed to terminate the deal at the end of the season by mutual consent.

References 

2010–11
2010–11 Premier League by team
2010–11 UEFA Europa League participants seasons